Red Line 9 (extension) of the Mumbai Metro is part of the metro system for the city of Mumbai, India. Metro Line 9 is an extension of the Red Line from Andheri to CSMIA and Dahisar to Mira Road. This line will be unique from the other metro lines because it will run on a double-decker bridge. There will be a flyover on the first deck and the metro will run on the second deck. The flyover will start near the proposed Shivaji Chowk (Mira Road) metro station and will end in Bhayander (West) via Mira Bhayander Road. It shall provide interconnectivity among the Western Express Highway, the Western Line, and the Mumbai Metro (Line 2 and Line 7).

J Kumar Infraprojects Ltd. has received a Letter of Acceptance (LoA) from Mumbai Metropolitan Region Development Authority (MMRDA) for the design and construction of Mumbai Metro Line 9. A maintenance depot has been proposed at Mira-Bhayandar (main depot for entire Red line). The depot is proposed behind Netaji Subhash Chandra Bose Stadium. This will be one of the biggest metro depots of Mumbai. Total land area proposed for maintenance facilities is 20.0 Ha.

It will be an  line with an expected ridership of 8.47 lakh (847,000) commuters per day by 2021 and 11.12 lakh (1.112 million) commuters by 2031.

Planning
In February 2017, the MMRDA announced that the DMRC was preparing a detailed project report (DPR) on Line 9, a proposed  extension of Metro 7 from Dahisar to Bhayander, via Mira Road. Preliminary plans prepared jointly by MMRDA and DMRC, proposed a  elevated extension of Metro 7 from Dahisar to Bhayander, via Mira Road. The line will run parallel to the Surat-Dahisar Highway, then turn left at Kashi Mira Junction, before passing through Mira Road-Bhayander, and terminating at Golden Nest Circle, Bhayander. The project is estimated to cost . The extension was approved by the Maharashtra government in September 2018, and will be implemented as Metro 9. Prime Minister Narendra Modi laid the foundation stone for Metro 5 (Thane-Bhiwandi-Kalyan) and Metro 9 (Dahisar-Mira Bhayander) in December 2018, along with Maharashtra chief minister Devendra Fadnavis.

In March 2017, the MMRDA stated that the DMRC was conducting a feasibility study to extend the line to the T2 terminal of the airport. The proposed  extension from Andheri to the domestic airport will pass beneath Line 1's WEH station and is expected to cost between Rs 1,500 and 2,000 crore. The extensions to Mira Road and the airport were officially announced by Chief Minister Fadnavis on 30 March 2017. The alignment for the extension from Andheri to Chhatrapati Shivaji Maharaj International Terminus was approved by the State Cabinet on 12 April 2017. The  includes a  elevated stretch and  tunnel. The Maharashtra Cabinet approved the implementation of the extension, called Metro 7A, in September 2018. Work on Metro 7A is expected to begin by April 2019. Nine months after Prime Minister Narendra Modi laid its foundation stone in Bhiwandi, the construction work for the much-awaited Metro-9 (Dahisar to Bhayandar) route finally commenced in September 2019.

J Kumar Infraprojects has received a Letter of Acceptance from Mumbai Metropolitan Region Development Authority (MMRDA) for Rs 1998 crore work related to Mumbai Metro Rail Project which includes design and construction of elevated viaduct and nine elevated stations including two flyovers, twin tunnel, cut and cover, ramp and one underground station for corridor of Mumbai Metro Line 9.

Construction
J Kumar Infraprojects  received letter of acceptance from MMRDA for a contract worth Rs 1,998 crore. The company letter of acceptance (LoA) from Mumbai Metropolitan Region Development Authority (MMRDA) is for design and construction of elevated viaduct and nine elevated stations, including two flyovers, and twin tunnel, cut and cover, ramp and one underground station for corridor of Mumbai Metro Line 9 and 7A (extension of line 7 from Dahisar (East) To Mira-Bhayandar and Andheri to CSIA of Mumbai Metro Rail project of MMRDA). The announcement was made at 13 September 2019.

Current Status for Line 9

Stations
As per MMRDA official website, 10 stations are being planned on Line 9. -

 
It will be having total 10 stations and proposed stations are –

Deepak Hospital (Meditiya Nagar) interchange station is the combination of the two Island platforms dedicated to the tracks of two separate corridors. This station consists of a common concourse area and contains service areas dedicated to separate corridors. Four Entry exits have been planned to provide easy access to the station for all passengers, from each side of the intersection, without having to cross vehicular traffic on the busy road. The integrated entrances for intersecting lines are at the ground level from where the passengers can access the concourse. Concourse houses ticketing for corridors, lifts, stairs and escalators to reach both the platforms dedicated to different lines. It will connect Bhayandar and Bhayandar West Metro Station

2 stations are being planned on Line 9 for interchange station from Deepak Hospital (Medtiya Nagar) towards Bhayandar East

Depot
MMRDA has proposed Rai & Murdhe area of Bhayandar West for the construction of maintenance depot for the entire Red line of Mumbai Metro (Line 9, Line 7 & Line 7A). Since protest from some activists and local residents of the area MMRDA is facing land acquisition challenges. MMRDA is seeking for feasible options and outcome for the final plan for the depot construction is expected soon.

References

Mumbai Metro lines
25 kV AC railway electrification